Oranje Hein may refer to:

 Oranje Hein (1925 film), a 1925 Dutch film
 Oranje Hein (1936 film), a 1936 Dutch film